The 2020 Formula One Esports Series was the fourth season of the Formula One Esports Series. It started on October 14, 2020, and ended on December 17, 2020. It was held on Formula One's official 2020 game. As a response to the COVID-19 pandemic the championship had no fixed venue, and was instead held online and streamed on the official F1 Youtube channel.

David Tonizza and Red Bull Racing Esports entered the season as the reigning Drivers' and Teams' champions respectively. Red Bull Racing Esports successfully defended the Teams' Championship title for the second consecutive year, while Jarno Opmeer won the Drivers' Championship title for the first time, driving for Alfa Romeo Racing Orlen Esports.

Format 

 Qualification - The season opens with online qualification, a global call for participation. Qualification is open to anyone with a copy of the official Formula 1 video game developed by Codemasters. The fastest gamers get through.
 Pro Draft - Qualifying gamers enter the Pro Draft where the official Formula 1 teams select their drivers to represent them in the F1 Esports Pro Series championships.
 Pro Series - The drivers race in 35% races over a series of events that are broadcast live. They earn points for themselves and their F1 teams. These races will determine the  F1 New Balance Esports Series Teams’ and Drivers’ World Champions, with a portion of the prize fund distributed to the teams based on their standings.

Teams and drivers

Calendar

Results

Season summary

Championship standings

Scoring system 
Points were awarded to the top 10 classified finishers in the race and one point was given to the driver who set the fastest lap inside the top ten. No extra points are awarded to the pole-sitter.

In the event of a tie at the conclusion of the championship, a count-back system is used as a tie-breaker, with a driver's/constructor's best result used to decide the standings.

Drivers' Championship standings

Teams' Championship standings 

 Notes: 
The standings are sorted by best result, rows are not related to the drivers. In case of tie on points, the best positions achieved determined the outcome.

References

External links 
 

Formula One Esports Series
2020 in Formula One
Formula One eSports Series